Presidential elections were held in Mongolia on 22 May 2005. The result was a victory for Nambaryn Enkhbayar of the Mongolian People's Revolutionary Party (MPRP), who received over half of the vote.

Background
In the 1997 presidential election the chairman of the Mongolian People's Revolutionary Party, Natsagiin Bagabandi was elected president. He was re-elected in 2001 but term limits meant he could not stand again in 2005. After the 2004 parliamentary elections the Mongolian People's Revolutionary Party and the Democratic Party were forced to form a coalition government after a close result.

Candidates
Four candidates stood in the 2005 presidential election. The Mongolian People's Revolutionary Party candidate was the former Prime Minister and current speaker of the parliament of Mongolia Nambaryn Enkhbayar. Enkhbayar had been chairman of the MPRP since 1997 and was regarded as the clear favourite in the election. He said that he would increase foreign investment and continue to liberalise the economy to try and address poverty in Mongolia.

His main rival was Mendsaikhany Enkhsaikhan of the Democratic party. He got support from anti-communists and called for lower taxes for business and subsidies for poorer families. However he was disadvantaged by divisions within the Democratic party.

The other two candidates were Bazarsad Jargalsaikhan of the Mongolian Republican Party and Badarchiin Erdenebat of the Motherland Party. Jargalsaikhan was one of richest people in Mongolia and said that he could put his business skills to use as President. Erdenebat called for a referendum to be held to increase the powers of the President.

Campaign
About a million of Mongolia's population were eligible to vote in the election with 3,800 polling stations across Mongolia. If no candidate secured over half of the votes in the first round of the election then a run-off would be held on 5 June between the top two candidates. The campaign for the first round officially began on 7 April 2005.

A few days before the election 3 of the 4 candidates called on the General Election Committee to resign alleging that the election was not being run cleanly. The outgoing President said that the committee should do everything possible to ensure the election was fair. Before the election there were protests in the capital Ulan Bator calling for a more open electoral system and protesting against alleged corruption. However international election monitors reported that they did not find any irregularities in the election.

Voting began at 7am and voter turnout was high as usual in Mongolia. Many voters turned out in traditional Mongolian costumes, some on horseback, while elsewhere poll workers took ballot boxes to nomadic Mongols who were unable to get to polling stations.

Results
Enkhbayer secured more than 50% of the votes thus winning an outright victory in the first round and avoiding the need for a run-off. After the results were announced Enkhsaikhan called Enkhbayar to congratulate him on his victory and they discussed working together. Enkhbayar was inaugurated as president on 24 June and promised to fulfill the pledges that he had made during the campaign.

References

Mongolia
Presidential elections in Mongolia
2005 in Mongolia